Lucas Bruchet (born February 23, 1991, in Vancouver, British Columbia) is a Canadian track and field athlete who competed in the middle-distance events, predominantly the 5,000m event. He competed in the 5000 metres at the 2015 Pan American Games in Toronto, where he finished 8th.

Running career
Bruchet ran collegially for the University of British Columbia.
In June 2016, he ran a personal best of 13:24.10 (in the 5,000 metres event), meeting the Olympic Standard. In July, he was officially named to the Olympic team. In the Men's 5,000 metres at the 2016 Olympics he finished 37th after failing to qualify for the finals

He competed at the 2020 Summer Olympics in the 5000m where he was 12th in his heat.

In February of 2023 he announced he was retiring form professional running.

High school

Bruchet attended Elgin Park Secondary in Surrey, British Columbia. While still in high school, Bruchet finished in seventh place in the 1500 meters at the 2009 Pan American Junior Athletics Championships

Career Highlights
Canadian Cross Country Champion
2013, 2017, 2018

Personal bests
1500 metres (track) - 3:37.79 (2021)
One Mile (indoor track) - 3.57.71 (2014)
3000 metres (track) - 7:46.89 (2017)
5,000 metres (track) - 13:12.56 min (2021)
10,000 metres (track) - 27:56.12 min (2022)
5 km (road) - 14:08 min (2016)

References

External links
 

1991 births
Living people
Athletes (track and field) at the 2015 Pan American Games
Pan American Games track and field athletes for Canada
Athletes from Vancouver
Canadian male long-distance runners
Athletes (track and field) at the 2016 Summer Olympics
Olympic track and field athletes of Canada
Athletes (track and field) at the 2020 Summer Olympics